Assunta Spina is a 1948 Italian drama film directed by Mario Mattoli and starring Anna Magnani, Antonio Centa and Giacomo Furia. It was adapted from Salvatore Di Giacomo's 1909 play of the same title. It was released in the United States with the title Scarred. It was shot at the Farnesina Studios in Rome and on location in Naples. The film's sets were designed by the art director Piero Filippone. Distributed by Titanus it earned around 70 million lira at the domestic box office.

Plot
The film takes place in Naples at the turn of the twentieth century. Assunta, a passionate and impulsive woman, is scarred on the face by her lover Michele for making him jealous. He is sentenced to serve two years in prison in Avellino, despite her efforts to exonerate him at the trial.
While he is inside she begins a relationship with a court official. When Michele is released and kills the man, she chooses to take the blame for the crime.

Cast
Anna Magnani as Assunta Spina
Eduardo De Filippo as Michele Boccadifuoco
Antonio Centa as Chancellor Federico Funelli
Aldo Bufi Landi as Brigadier Marcello Flaiano
Titina De Filippo as Emilia Forcinelli
Giacomo Furia as Tittariello
Ugo D'Alessio as Epanimonda Pesce
Pietro Carloni as President of the Court
Aldo Giuffrè as Brigadier Mancuso

References

External links

Italian historical drama films
1940s historical drama films
1948 drama films
Italian black-and-white films
Films directed by Mario Mattoli
Films set in Naples
Films shot in Naples
Films set in the 1900s
Films scored by Renzo Rossellini
Italian films based on plays
1940s Italian films